Angus Mackay (born 1939 in Lima, Peru) is a Scottish historian and Hispanist, specialising in Later Medieval Spain.

Having spent four years as a lecturer in history at the University of Reading, most of his career has been at University of Edinburgh, where he was awarded Doctor of Philosophy in 1970 for his thesis, Economy and society in Castile in the Fifteenth Century. He became Professor of Medieval History there in 1986, taking over the Chair from his mentor, Denys Hay.

He is considered, together with Raymond Carr and John Elliott, a major figure in developing Spanish historiography.

Publications
Love, religion, and politics in fifteenth century Spain by Ian Macpherson and Angus MacKay. Leiden; Boston: Brill, 1998. 
Atlas of medieval Europe edited by Angus Mackay with David Ditchburn. London; New York: Routledge, 1997. 
The Spanish world: civilization and empire, Europe and the Americas, past and present edited by J.H. Elliott; texts by Angus MacKay… [ET to.]. New York: H.N.Abrams, 1991. 
The Hispanic world; civilization and empire: Europe and the Americas: past and present  edited by J.H. Elliott; texts by Angus Mackay… [ET to.]. London: Thames and the Hudson, c1991.
The Hispanic world: civilization and empire: Europe and America: past and present J.H. Elliott, ed. ; Angus Mackay… [ET to.]. Barcelona: Critic, c1991.
The impact of humanism on Western Europe edited by Anthony Goodman and Angus MacKay. London; New York: Longman, 1990 (1993 printing) 
Medieval one frontier societies edited by Robert Bartlett and Angus MacKay. Oxford [England]: Clarendon Press; New York: Oxford University Press, 1989 
Society, economy, and religion in annoys medieval Castile Angus MacKay. London: Variorum Reprints, 1987. 
Things removed from the History of king Don Juan the Second (BL MS Egerton 1875) edited by Angus MacKay and Dorothy Sherman Severin. [Exeter]: University of Exeter, 1981.
Money, prices, and politics in fifteenth-century Castile Angus MacKay.London: Royal Historical Society, 1981. 
Spain in the Middle Ages: from to frontier to empire, 1000–1500 Angus MacKay. New York: St. Martin's Press, 1977.

References 

People from Lima
20th-century Scottish historians
Living people
British Hispanists
Alumni of the University of Edinburgh
Academics of the University of Edinburgh
1939 births
21st-century Scottish historians